Antônio Naelson Matias (born 23 May 1976), known as Sinha or Zinha, is a former professional footballer who played as an attacking midfielder. Born in Brazil, he represented the Mexico national team. He also played at the 2006 World Cup.

Club career
Sinha was born in Itajá, a city located in the northwest of the Brazilian state of Rio Grande do Norte.
He began his career playing for Rio Grande do Norte's capital city team América FC.

Sinha arrived in 1998 to Mexico, when he joined CF Monterrey. In 1999, he moved to Toluca. Sinha is widely known for his dribbling skills, his accurate passing and his intelligence on the pitch as well as his leadership and long distance shot.

On February 12, 2017, Sinha achieved 600 official caps (including cup matches) with Toluca. This coincided with Toluca's 100 year anniversary.

On April 30, 2017, Sinha was given a brief ceremony at the Estadio Nemesio Diez during the last home regular season game for Toluca.

International career
He was part of the Mexican 2004 Olympic football team, who exited in the first round, having finished third in group A, below group winners Mali and South Korea.

He has also been called up to play for Mexico, although he is a Brazilian-born player, he became a naturalized Mexican citizen, after settling in Mexico for several years. During the 2006 FIFA World Cup in Germany, Sinha became the first foreign-born player to score a goal for Mexico in a World Cup tournament, scoring against Iran. He was called up to play again for Mexico, thus making him the first naturalized to be called up by Hugo Sánchez.

In 2005, he played in the Confederations Cup scoring a goal against Japan that helped Mexico win the match. Mexico finished in fourth place in the tournament. He was also called up for the national team to play in the Gold Cup.

During the 2011 CONCACAF Gold Cup, Sinha, and four other members of the Mexico national team tested positive for the banned substance of Clenbuterol and were removed from the team's tournament squad. However, all players were exonerated as FIFA determined that the accused had accidentally ingested the banned substance through contaminated meat that had been served during a pre-tournament training camp.

However, World Anti-Doping Agency appealed to the Court of Arbitration for Sport to request a ban.  But on 12 October 2011 WADA withdrew this request after the full file was available for them.

His final competitive match would come during a difficult time for the Mexico national team, as they barely qualified for the World Cup playoff against New Zealand. Miguel Herrera found it necessary to only call up Liga MX players thus including the veteran Sinha on his roster. Sinha would sub in during both legs of the play-offs as Mexico successfully advanced to the 2014 FIFA World Cup.

Career statistics

International

International goals
Scores and results list Mexico's goal tally first.

|-
| 1. || October 13, 2004 || Estadio Cuauhtémoc, Puebla, Mexico ||  || align=center|1–0 || align=center|3–0 || 2006 FIFA World Cup qualification
|-
| 2. || March 27, 2005 || Estadio Azteca, Mexico City, Mexico ||  || align=center|2–0 || align=center|2–1 || 2006 FIFA World Cup qualification
|-
| 3. || June 4, 2005 || Estadio Mateo Flores, Guatemala City, Guatemala ||  || align=center|1–0 || align=center|2–0 || 2006 FIFA World Cup qualification
|-
| 4. || June 16, 2005 || AWD-Arena, Hanover, Germany ||  || align=center|1–1 || align=center|2–1 || 2005 FIFA Confederations Cup
|-
| 5. || June 11, 2006 || Frankenstadion, Nuremberg, Germany ||  || align=center|3–1 || align=center|3–1 || 2006 FIFA World Cup
|-
| 6. || June 4, 2008 || Qualcomm Stadium, San Diego, United States ||  || align=center|1–3 || align=center|1–4 || Friendly
|}

Honours
Toluca
Mexican Primera División: Verano 2000, Apertura 2002, Apertura 2005, Apertura 2008, Bicentenario 2010
Campeón de Campeones: 2003, 2006
CONCACAF Champions' Cup: 2003

Individual
Mexican Primera División Attacking Midfielder of the Tournament: Apertura 2008, Bicentenario 2010
Mexican Primera División Golden Ball: Apertura 2008, Bicentenario 2010
FIFA Confederations Cup Best Goal

References

External links

Football Database.com provides Antônio Naelson's profile and stats
CBF 
Antônio Naelson Article 

1976 births
Living people
People from Rio Grande do Norte
Naturalized citizens of Mexico
Brazilian emigrants to Mexico
Mexican footballers
Mexico international footballers
América Futebol Clube (MG) players
Liga MX players
C.F. Monterrey players
Deportivo Toluca F.C. players
Querétaro F.C. footballers
Olympic footballers of Mexico
Footballers at the 2004 Summer Olympics
2005 FIFA Confederations Cup players
2005 CONCACAF Gold Cup players
2006 FIFA World Cup players
2011 CONCACAF Gold Cup players
CONCACAF Gold Cup-winning players
Association football midfielders
Mexican people of Brazilian descent